Tsentralna is a station currently under construction on the Dnipro Metro's Tsentralno–Zavodska Line. Deputy Mayor of Dnipro Mykhailo Lysenko stated in December 2020 that it was estimated to be opened in 2024.

History
The station was already envisioned in the 1980 official planning of the city's metro lines (the station was to be named "Ploshcha Lenina"). It was originally scheduled to be opened in 1993 as Ploshcha Lenina, the station's construction was delayed significantly after the fall of the Soviet Union. Budget issues and economic instability in Ukraine further delayed the station's opening.

As an expansion of the current Dnipro Metro the station was projected to be opened by 2015. But construction was stopped because the tender to select the contractor was stopped by the city council in August 2015. Works are formally restarted in January 2017 and currently works are concentrated around future escalator shaft.

It is not known what final form the station will take on; whether it will be a deep column or a single-vault station.

It is projected that when a second metro line will be added to the system, Tsentralna will serve as a transfer station to the future second line's "Yevropeiska Ploshcha" station.

Progress

References

External links
 (Images of the station under construction) 

Dnipro Metro stations
Railway stations scheduled to open in 2024